Metacinema, also meta-cinema, is a mode of filmmaking in which the film informs the audience that they are watching a work of fiction. Metacinema often references its own production, working against narrative conventions that aim to maintain the audience's suspension of disbelief. Elements of metacinema includes scenes where characters discuss the making of the film or where production equipment and facilities are shown. It is analogous to metafiction in literature.

History
Examples of metacinema date back to the early days of narrative filmmaking. In the 1940s, backstage musicals and comedies like Road to Singapore (Victor Schertzinger, 1940) and Hellzapoppin' (H. C. Potter, 1941) exhibited a vogue for exploration of the medium of film at a time when Hollywood classicism dominated. Metacinema can be identified in art cinema of the 1960s like 8½ (Federico Fellini, 1963) or The Passion of Anna (Ingmar Bergman, 1969), and it can often be found in the self-reflexive filmmaking of the French New Wave in films like Contempt (Jean-Luc Godard, 1963) and Day for Night (François Truffaut, 1973). Other examples include F for Fake (Orson Welles, 1973) and Through the Olive Trees (Abbas Kiarostami, 1994).

Community (2009–2015) is a sitcom which has elements of metacinema, particularly through the character of Abed Nadir (Danny Pudi) who makes comments about himself and his friends being in a sitcom, such as commenting that they are in a bottle episode in the bottle episode: Cooperative Calligraphy (Series 2: Episode 8), and the episode Messianic Myths and Ancient Peoples (Series 2: Episode 5) consists of Abed making his own metacinema film.

References

Film genres
Films about filmmaking
Metafiction
Metafictional techniques